A zibaldone (plural zibaldoni) is an Italian vernacular commonplace book. The word means "a heap of things" or "miscellany" in Italian. The earliest such books were kept by Venetian merchants in the fourteenth century, taking the form of a small or medium-format paper codex.

The word may also refer specifically to the best-known such book: the Zibaldone di pensieri by Giacomo Leopardi, often called simply The Zibaldone. Giovanni Boccaccio left behind three zibaldoni.

Furthermore, there is a twice-yearly German-language journal entitled Zibaldone. Zeitschrift für italienische Kultur der Gegenwart (Journal for Italian Culture of the Present Day).

References

Diaries